Jackson County is a county in the U.S. state of South Dakota. As of the 2020 census, the population was 2,806. Its county seat is Kadoka. The county was created in 1883, and was organized in 1915. Washabaugh County was merged into Jackson County in 1983.

Geography
The terrain of Jackson County consists of mountains rising from rolling hills. The ground is arid and carved with drainages. The White River flows eastward, cutting a meandering channel through the central part. The terrain generally slopes to the NE; its highest point is a ridge near the SW corner, at 3,274' (998m) ASL.

About 57 percent of its land, the portion south of White River, is on the Pine Ridge Indian Reservation. The county includes the easternmost portion of Badlands National Park. 

South Dakota's eastern counties (48 of 66) observe Central Time; the western counties (18 of 66) observe Mountain Time. Jackson County is the easternmost of the state's counties to observe Mountain Time.

Major highways

  Interstate 90
  U.S. Highway 14
  South Dakota Highway 44
  South Dakota Highway 63
  South Dakota Highway 73
  South Dakota Highway 377

Adjacent counties

 Haakon County - north
 Jones County - northeast (observes Central Time)
 Mellette County - east (observes Central Time)
 Todd County - southeast (observes Central Time)
 Bennett County - south
 Oglala Lakota County - southwest
 Pennington County - northwest

Lakes
 Kadoka Lake
 Wanblee Lake

National protected areas
 Badlands National Park (part)
 Buffalo Gap National Grassland (part)
 Minuteman Missile National Historic Site (part)

Demographics

2000 census
As of the 2000 United States Census, there were 2,930 people, 945 households, and 675 families living in the county. The population density was 2 people per square mile (1/km2). There were 1,173 housing units at an average density of 0.6 per square mile (0.2/km2). The racial makeup of the county was 50.07% White, 0.03% Black or African American, 47.85% Native American, 0.03% Asian, 0.03% Pacific Islander, 0.14% from other races, and 1.84% from two or more races. 0.41% of the population were Hispanic or Latino of any race.

There were 945 households, out of which 38.60% had children under the age of 18 living with them, 51.40% were married couples living together, 14.70% had a female householder with no husband present, and 28.50% were non-families. 25.20% of all households were made up of individuals, and 11.90% had someone living alone who was 65 years of age or older. The average household size was 3.08 and the average family size was 3.73.

The county population contained 36.50% under the age of 18, 8.00% from 18 to 24, 23.60% from 25 to 44, 20.30% from 45 to 64, and 11.60% who were 65 years of age or older. The median age was 31 years. For every 100 females there were 98.80 males. For every 100 females age 18 and over, there were 95.40 males.

The median income for a household in the county was $23,945, and the median income for a family was $25,161. Males had a median income of $22,460 versus $17,895 for females. The per capita income for the county was $9,981. About 29.50% of families and 36.50% of the population were below the poverty line, including 46.10% of those under age 18 and 20.10% of those age 65 or over. The county's per-capita income makes it one of the poorest counties in the United States.

2010 census
As of the 2010 United States Census, there were 3,031 people, 996 households, and 703 families living in the county. The racial makeup of the county was 52.0% American Indian, 42.7% white, 0.2% black or African American, 0.2% from other races, and 4.8% from two or more races. Those of Hispanic or Latino origin made up 1.3% of the population. In terms of ancestry, 20.7% were German, 12.3% were Irish, 10.1% were Norwegian, 5.7% were English, and 0.2% were American.

Of the 996 households, 40.2% had children under the age of 18 living with them, 45.8% were married couples living together, 16.2% had a female householder with no husband present, 29.4% were non-families, and 26.2% of all households were made up of individuals. The average household size was 3.00 and the average family size was 3.65. The median age was 31.5 years.

The median income for a household in the county was $36,354 and the median income for a family was $41,838. Males had a median income of $32,377 versus $25,000 for females. The per capita income for the county was $14,568. About 20.6% of families and 30.0% of the population were below the poverty line, including 35.9% of those under age 18 and 5.6% of those age 65 or over.

Communities

City
 Kadoka (county seat) (Pop:543)

Towns
 Belvidere (Population:46)
 Cottonwood (Population:12)
 Interior (Population:65)

Census-designated place
 Wanblee (Population:674)

Unincorporated communities

 Cactus Flat
 Hisle
 Long Valley
 Potato Creek
 Stamford
 Weta

Townships

 Grandview II
 Interior
 Jewett
 Wall
 Weta

Unorganized territories

 East Jackson
 Northwest Jackson
 Southeast Jackson
 Southwest Jackson

Politics
Jackson County voters have been reliably Republican for decades. In only one national election since 1936 has the county selected the Democratic Party candidate.

See also

 National Register of Historic Places listings in Jackson County, South Dakota

References

 
1915 establishments in South Dakota
Populated places established in 1915